Crook of Devon railway station served the village of Crook of Devon, Kinross-shire, Scotland, from 1863 to 1964 on the Devon Valley Railway.

History 
The station opened on 1 May 1863 by the Devon Valley Railway. It was also known as Crook of Devon for Fossoway in the 1904 timetable. It closed on 15 June 1964.

References

External links 

Railway stations in Great Britain opened in 1863
Railway stations in Great Britain closed in 1964
Beeching closures in Scotland
1863 establishments in Scotland
1964 disestablishments in Scotland